Ricky Lee Williamson (born 1962) is a United States Navy vice admiral who currently serves as Deputy Chief of Naval Operations for Fleet Readiness and Logistics since June 27, 2019. He previously served as the Commander of Navy Region Europe, Africa, Central, Commander of Navy Region Mid-Atlantic, Commander of Navy Region Southeast, and Commander of Navy Region Midwest. Williamson graduated from the United States Naval Academy with a B.S. degree in computer science in 1985 and later earned an M.B.A. degree from the Naval Postgraduate School in 1990.

References

1962 births
Living people
Place of birth missing (living people)
United States Naval Academy alumni
Naval Postgraduate School alumni
Recipients of the Legion of Merit
United States Navy admirals